Since the advent of differential privacy, a number of systems supporting differentially private data analyses have been implemented and deployed. This article tracks real-world deployments, production software packages, and research prototypes.

Real-world deployments

Production software packages 
These software packages purport to be usable in production systems. They are split in two categories: those focused on answering statistical queries with differential privacy, and those focused on training machine learning models with differential privacy.

Statistical analyses

Machine learning

Research projects and prototypes

Attacks on implementations 

In addition to standard defects of software artifacts that can be identified using testing or fuzzing, implementations of differentially private mechanisms may suffer from the following vulnerabilities:

 Subtle algorithmic or analytical mistakes.

 Timing side-channel attacks. In contrast with timing attacks against implementations of cryptographic algorithms that typically have low leakage rate and must be followed with non-trivial cryptanalysis, a timing channel may lead to a catastrophic compromise of a differentially private system, since a targeted attack can be used to exfiltrate the very bit that the system is designed to hide.

 Leakage through floating-point arithmetic. Differentially private algorithms are typically presented in the language of probability distributions, which most naturally lead to implementations using floating-point arithmetic. The abstraction of floating-point arithmetic is leaky, and without careful attention to details, a naive implementation may fail to provide differential privacy. (This is particularly the case for ε-differential privacy, which does not allow any probability of failure, even in the worst case.) For example, the support of a textbook sampler of the Laplace distribution (required, for instance, for the Laplace mechanism) is less than 80% of all double-precision floating point numbers; moreover, the support for distributions with different means are not identical. A single sample from a naïve implementation of the Laplace mechanism allows distinguishing between two adjacent datasets with probability more than 35%.

 Timing channel through floating-point arithmetic. Unlike operations over integers that are typically constant-time on modern CPUs, floating-point arithmetic exhibits significant input-dependent timing variability. Handling of subnormals can be particularly slow, as much as by ×100 compared to the typical case.

See also 
 Differential Privacy
 Secure multi-party computation

References 

Differential privacy   
Information privacy